The 7th National Games of the People's Republic of China was held from September 4 to September 15, 1993 in Beijing. Qi Yunhui started the Games, to be held every four years one year after the Olympic Games. For the opening ceremony, China's major state leaders including CCP General Secretary Jiang Zemin, Premier Li Peng, and Vice-premier Zhu Rongji were present. The main current games are hosted by Beijing, Sichuan and Qinhuangdao City. The games played a significant role in Beijing's bid for the 2000 Olympic Games, as they were used to test and see if Beijing was capable of hosting big international meetings.

Emblem
The emblem is a burning torch, accompanied by the Roman numeral VII (seven), shaped into a runway by two opposite "7" symbols, representing the number of sessions.

List of Heads of Delegations
 Beijing: He Luli
 Tianjin: Qian ao
 Hebei: Wangyou Hui
 Shanxi: U Tha only
 Mongolia: Zhao Zhihong
 Liaoning: Chang Yung-ming
 Jilin: Zhangyue Qi
 Heilongjiang: ZhouTieNong
 Shanghai: Gong Xueping
 Jiangsu: Zhang Huaixi
 Zhejiang: Xu pure
 Anhui: Du Yijin
 Fujian: Wang Liangpu
 Jiangxi: Mao Huang Heng
 Shandong: Aiying
 Henan : Zhang Shiying
 Hubei: Hannan Peng
 Hunan: Pan Guiyu
 Guangdong: Li Lanfang
 Guangxi: Li latent
 Hainan: Liu Ming Kai
 Sichuan: Pu Haiqing
 Guizhou: Zhang Yuqin
 Yunnan: Wangguang Xian
 Tibet: Jeep Puncog times · Gordon
 Shaanxi: Kang Shin true
 Gansu: Zhang Yue Wu
 Qinghai: Class Madain increase
 Ningxia: Liu Zhong
 Xinjiang: Wu Fu Er · Abdullah
 Garde: Chiang advanced
 Geology: Jiang Cheng Siong
 Space: Zhu Yuli, Wang Li Heng
 Chemicals: Tan Zhuzhou
 Light: - {Yu Zhen} -
 Locomotive: Lee SenMao
 Posts: Liu Pingyuan
 Forestry: Cai Yansong
 Silver Eagle: Bai Wenqing
 Petrochemical: Li Yi
 Coal: Baoming
 Oil: Admiralty super
 Automotive: Yu Zhi ring, Ding Zhihuan
 People's Liberation Army: Liu Xiaojiang

Sports
There were a total of 43 sports contested across three cities.

Aquatics
 
 
 
 
 
 
 
 
 
 
 
 
 
 
 
 
 
Gymnastics

Locations
Beijing hosted 26 events: athletics, swimming, gymnastics, artistic gymnastics, weight lifting, fencing , judo, international style wrestling, boxing, modern pentathlon, equestrianism, Chinese-style wrestling, Go , speed skating, short track skating, cycling, navigation model, radio direction finding, parachute, soccer, basketball, table tennis, tennis, handball, hockey, and women's softball.

Sichuan hosted 15 events: diving, water polo, synchronized swimming, fencing, shooting, archery, rowing, kayaking, swimming, water skiing, aviation model, volleyball, badminton, baseball, and martial arts.

Qinhuangdao City hosted two events: sailing and windsurfing.

Records
There were 4 world records set at the Games. Three of them in Athletics were:

 Women's 1500 meters: Qu Yunxia ran 3:50.46.
 Women's 3000 meters: Wang Junxia ran 8:06.11.
 Women's 10000 meters: Wang Junxia ran 29:31.78.

More details: See Athletics at the 1993 National Games of China.

Medals

 
National Games of China